At the 1948 Winter Olympics, five Nordic skiing events were contested: three cross-country skiing events, one ski jumping event, and one Nordic combined event, all for men only.

1948 Winter Olympics events
1948